Bo Daniel Ekelund (26 July 1894 – 1 April 1983) was a Swedish high jumper who won a bronze medal at the 1920 Summer Olympics. Ekelund was a top Scandinavian high jumper in the late 1910s. He won the Swedish Games with a jump of 1.85 m in 1916, the Scandinavian triangular meet in 1919, and Swedish national titles in 1919 and 1920. In September 1919 he set a new Scandinavian record at 1.93 m, which was the world's best jump in 1919. He received the Swedish sport award Stora Grabbars Märke in 1928.

Ekelund retired from competitions in 1921, when he took an engineering job in Shanghai with the company Armerad Betong, eventually becoming its director. After returning to Sweden, he was also active in local politics as a member of the town council. In parallel he acted as a sports administrator, serving as Secretary-General of the Stockholm University Sports Club in 1915, President of the Swedish Athletic Association in 1925–34, and Secretary-General of the IAAF in 1930–46. He also held a leading position at the Swedish Olympic Committee.

References

External links 
 

1894 births
1983 deaths
Swedish male high jumpers
Olympic bronze medalists for Sweden
Athletes (track and field) at the 1920 Summer Olympics
Olympic athletes of Sweden
International Olympic Committee members
Swedish sports executives and administrators
Medalists at the 1920 Summer Olympics
Olympic bronze medalists in athletics (track and field)
People from Gävle
Sportspeople from Gävleborg County